Georg Andreas Helwing (14 December 1666 – 3 January 1748) was a botanist and Lutheran pastor.

Helwing was born in Angerburg (Węgorzewo) in Brandenburg-Prussia's Duchy of Prussia. He became a "remote member" of the Prussian Academy of Sciences on 31 August 1709.

Helwing discovered and introduced several plants: Helwingia is named after him. He became known as the Tournefortius Borussicus and Prussian Plinius.

In 1999, the University of Warmia and Mazury in Olsztyn was founded with reference to him.

It has been suggested that Georg Andreas Helwing was the inspiration for the character Abraham Van Helsing in Bram Stoker's famous novel Dracula.

Works 

 
 Flora Quasimodogenita. Gedani. Leipzig 1713
 
 Lithographia Angerburgica, P.I. Regiom. 1717, Leipzig 1720
 Flora Campana. Leipzig 1720

References and external links 

https://web.archive.org/web/20070622050859/http://www.bbaw.de/archivbbaw/akademiemitglieder/vorgaengermitglieder_h.html
http://www.litdok.de/cgi-bin/litdok?lang=de&t_idn=yp07560

1666 births
1748 deaths
People from the Duchy of Prussia
People from Węgorzewo
18th-century German botanists
18th-century German Lutheran clergy
17th-century German botanists